Les Artigues-de-Lussac is a commune in the Gironde department in southwestern France. It is around 10 km northeast of Libourne, and around 35 km east-northeast of Bordeaux.

Population

See also
Communes of the Gironde department

References

Communes of Gironde